Earth's energy budget accounts for the balance between the energy that Earth receives from the Sun and the energy the Earth loses back into outer space. Smaller energy sources, such as Earth's internal heat, are taken into consideration, but make a tiny contribution compared to solar energy. The energy budget also accounts for how energy moves through the climate system.  Because the Sun heats the equatorial tropics more than the polar regions, received solar irradiance is unevenly distributed.  As the energy seeks equilibrium across the planet, it drives interactions in Earth's climate system, i.e., Earth's water, ice, atmosphere, rocky crust, and all living things.   The result is Earth's climate.  

Earth's energy budget depends on many factors, such as atmospheric aerosols, greenhouse gases, the planet's surface albedo (reflectivity), clouds, vegetation, land use patterns, and more.  When the incoming and outgoing energy fluxes are in balance, Earth is in radiative equilibrium and the climate system will be relatively stable.  Global warming occurs when earth receives more energy than it gives back to space, and global cooling takes place when the outgoing energy is greater.  Multiple types of measurements and observations show a warming imbalance since at least year 1970.   The rate of heating from this human-caused event is without precedent.

When the energy budget changes, there is a delay before average global surface temperature changes significantly.  This is due to the thermal inertia of the oceans, land and cryosphere.     Accurate quantification of these energy flows and storage amounts is a requirement within most climate models.

Earth's energy flows

In spite of the enormous transfers of energy into and from the Earth, it maintains a relatively constant temperature because, as a whole, there is little net gain or loss: Earth emits via atmospheric and terrestrial radiation (shifted to longer electromagnetic wavelengths) to space about the same amount of energy as it receives via solar insolation (all forms of electromagnetic radiation).

Incoming solar energy (shortwave radiation)

The total amount of energy received per second at the top of Earth's atmosphere (TOA) is measured in watts and is given by the solar constant times the cross-sectional area of the Earth corresponded to the radiation.  Because the surface area of a sphere is four times the cross-sectional area of a sphere (i.e. the area of a circle), the globally and yearly averaged TOA flux is one quarter of the solar constant and so is approximately 340 watts per square meter (W/m2). Since the absorption varies with location as well as with diurnal, seasonal and annual variations, the numbers quoted are multi-year averages obtained from multiple satellite measurements.

Of the ~340 W/m2 of solar radiation received by the Earth, an average of ~77 W/m2 is reflected back to space by clouds and the atmosphere and ~23 W/m2 is reflected by the surface albedo, leaving ~240 W/m2 of solar energy input to the Earth's energy budget. This amount is called the absorbed solar radiation (ASR).  It implies a value of about 0.3 for the mean net albedo of Earth, also called its Bond albedo (A):

Outgoing longwave radiation

Outgoing longwave radiation (OLR) is usually defined as outgoing energy leaving the planet, most of which is in the infrared band. Generally, absorbed solar energy is converted to different forms of heat energy.    Some of this energy is emitted as OLR directly to space, while the rest is first transported through the climate system as radiant and other forms of thermal energy.  For example, indirect emissions occur following heat transport from the planet's surface layers (land and ocean) to the atmosphere via evapotranspiration and latent heat fluxes or conduction/convection processes.  Ultimately, all of outgoing energy is radiated in the form of longwave radiation back into space.

The transport of OLR from Earth's surface through its multi-layered atmosphere follows Kirchoff's law of thermal radiation.  A one-layer model produces an approximate description of OLR which yields temperatures at the surface (Ts=288 Kelvin) and at the middle of the troposphere (Ta=242 Kelvin) that are close to observed average values:

In this expression σ is the Stefan-Boltzmann constant and ε represents the emissivity of the atmosphere.  Aerosols, clouds, water vapor, and trace greenhouse gases contribute to an effective value of about ε=0.78.  The strong (fourth-power) temperature sensitivity maintains a near-balance of the outgoing energy flow to the incoming flow via small changes in the planet's absolute temperatures.

Earth's internal heat sources and other small effects

The geothermal heat flow from the Earth's interior is estimated to be 47 terawatts (TW) and split approximately equally between radiogenic heat and heat left over from the Earth's formation.  This corresponds to an average flux of 0.087 W/m2 and represents only 0.027% of Earth's total energy budget at the surface, being dwarfed by the 173,000 TW of incoming solar radiation.

Human production of energy is even lower at an estimated 160,000 TW-hr for all of year 2019. This corresponds to an average continuous heat flow of about 18 TW.   However, consumption is growing rapidly and energy production with fossil fuels also produces an increase in atmospheric greenhouse gases, leading to a more than 20 times larger imbalance in the incoming/outgoing flows that originate from solar radiation. 

Photosynthesis also has a significant effect: An estimated 140 TW (or around 0.08%) of incident energy gets captured by photosynthesis, giving energy to plants to produce biomass.   A similar flow of thermal energy is released over the course of a year when plants are used as food or fuel.

Other minor sources of energy are usually ignored in the calculations, including accretion of interplanetary dust and solar wind, light from stars other than the Sun and the thermal radiation from space. Earlier, Joseph Fourier had claimed that deep space radiation was significant in a paper often cited as the first on the greenhouse effect.

Budget analysis 

In simplest terms, Earth's energy budget is balanced when the incoming flow equals the outgoing flow.   Since a portion of incoming energy is directly reflected,  the balance can also be stated as absorbed incoming solar (shortwave) radiation equal to outgoing longwave radiation:

Internal flow analysis
To describe some of the internal flows within the budget, let the insolation received at the top of the atmosphere be 100 units (=340 W/m2), as shown in the accompanying Sankey diagram. Called the albedo of Earth, around 35 units in this example are directly reflected back to space: 27 from the top of clouds, 2 from snow and ice-covered areas, and 6 by other parts of the atmosphere. The 65 remaining units (ASR=220 W/m2) are absorbed: 14 within the atmosphere and 51 by the Earth's surface. 

The 51 units reaching and absorbed by the surface are emitted back to space through various forms of terrestrial energy: 17 directly radiated to space and 34 absorbed by the atmosphere (19 through latent heat of vaporisation, 9 via convection and turbulence, and 6 as absorbed infrared by greenhouse gases). The 48 units absorbed by the atmosphere (34 units from terrestrial energy and 14 from insolation) are then finally radiated back to space.   This simplified example neglects some details of mechanisms that recirculate, store, and thus lead to further buildup of heat near the surface.

Ultimately the 65 units (17 from the ground and 48 from the atmosphere) are emitted as OLR.  They approximately balance the 65 units (ASR) absorbed from the sun in order to maintain a net-zero gain of energy by Earth.

Role of the greenhouse effect

The major atmospheric gases (oxygen and nitrogen) are transparent to incoming sunlight but are also transparent to outgoing longwave (thermal/infrared) radiation. However, water vapor, carbon dioxide, methane and other trace gases are opaque to many wavelengths of thermal radiation.

When greenhouse gas molecules absorb thermal infrared energy, their temperature rises. Those gases then radiate an increased amount of thermal infrared energy in all directions. Heat radiated upward continues to encounter greenhouse gas molecules; those molecules also absorb the heat, and their temperature rises and the amount of heat they radiate increases. The atmosphere thins with altitude, and at roughly 5–6 kilometres, the concentration of greenhouse gases in the overlying atmosphere is so thin that heat can escape to space.

Because greenhouse gas molecules radiate infrared energy in all directions, some of it spreads downward and ultimately returns to the Earth's surface, where it is absorbed. Earth's in-situ surface temperatures are thus higher than they would be if governed only by direct solar heating. This supplemental heating is the natural greenhouse effect. It is as if the Earth is covered by a blanket that allows high frequency radiation (sunlight) to enter, but slows the rate at which the longwave infrared radiation leaves.   

As viewed from Earth's surrounding space, greenhouse gases influence the planet's atmospheric emissivity (ε).  Changes in atmospheric composition can thus shift the overall radiation balance.  For example, an increase in heat trapping by a growing concentration of greenhouse gases (i.e. an enhanced greenhouse effect) forces a decrease in OLR and a warming (restorative) energy imbalance.  Ultimately when the amount of greenhouse gases increases or decreases, in-situ surface temperatures rise or fall until the ASR = OLR balance is again achieved.

Heat storage reservoirs
  Land, ice, and oceans are active material constituents of Earth's climate system along with the atmosphere.  They have far greater mass and heat capacity, and thus much more thermal inertia.  When radiation is directly absorbed or the surface temperature changes, thermal energy will flow as sensible heat either into or out of the bulk mass of these components via conduction/convection heat transfer processes.  The transformation of water between its solid/liquid/vapor states also acts as a source or sink of potential energy in the form of latent heat.   These processes buffer the surface conditions against some of the rapid radiative changes in the atmosphere.  As a result, the daytime versus nighttime difference in surface temperatures is relatively small.  Likewise, Earth's climate system as a whole shows a slow response to shifts in the atmospheric radiation balance.

The top few meters of Earth's oceans harbor more thermal energy than its entire atmosphere.  Like atmospheric gases, fluidic ocean waters transport vast amounts of such energy over the planet's surface.  Sensible heat also moves into and out of great depths under conditions that favor downwelling or upwelling.

Over 90 percent of the extra energy that has accumulated on Earth from ongoing global warming since 1970 has been stored in the ocean.  About one-third has propagated to depths below 700 meters.  The overall rate of growth has also risen during recent decades, reaching close to 500 TW (1 W/m2) as of 2020.  That led to about 14 zettajoules (ZJ) of heat gain for the year, exceeding the 570 exajoules (=160,000 TW-hr) of total primary energy consumed by humans by a factor of at least 20.

Heating/cooling rate analysis
Generally speaking,  changes to Earth's energy flux balance can be thought of as being the result of external forcings (both natural and anthropogenic, radiative and non-radiative), system feedbacks, and internal system variability.  Such changes are primarily expressed as observable shifts in temperature (T), clouds (C), water vapor (W), aerosols (A), trace greenhouse gases (G), land/ocean/ice surface reflectance (S), and as minor shifts in insolaton (I) among other possible factors.  Earth's heating/cooling rate can then be analyzed over selected timeframes (Δt) as the net change in energy (ΔE) associated with these attributes:

Here the term ΔET is negative-valued when temperature rises due to the strong direct influence on OLR.

The recent increase in trace greenhouse gases produces an enhanced greenhouse effect, and thus a positive ΔEG forcing term.  By contrast, a large volcanic eruption (e.g. Mount Pinatubo 1991, El Chichón 1982) can inject sulfur-containing compounds into the upper atmosphere. High concentrations of stratospheric sulfur aerosols may persist for up to a few years, yielding a negative forcing contribution to ΔEA. Various other types of anthropogenic aerosol emissions make both positive and negative contributions to ΔEA. Solar cycles produce ΔEI smaller in magnitude than those of recent ΔEG trends from human activity.  

Climate forcings are complex since they can produce direct and indirect feedbacks that intensify (positive feedback) or weaken (negative feedback) the original forcing. These often follow the temperature response.  Water vapor trends as a positive feedback with respect to temperature changes due to evaporation shifts and the Clausius-Clapeyron relation.  An increase in water vapor results in positive ΔEW due to further enhancement of the greenhouse effect. A slower positive feedback is the ice-albedo feedback.  For example,  the loss of Arctic ice due to rising temperatures makes the region less reflective, leading to greater absorption of energy and even faster ice melt rates, thus positive influence on ΔES.  Collectively, feedbacks tend to amplify global warming or cooling.

Clouds are responsible for about half of Earth's albedo and are powerful expressions of internal variability of the climate system.  They may also act as feedbacks to forcings,  and could be forcings themselves if for example a result of cloud seeding activity.  Contributions to ΔEC vary regionally and depending upon cloud type.  Measurements from satellites are gathered in concert with simulations from models in the effort to improve understanding and reduce uncertainty.

Earth's energy imbalance 

If Earth's incoming energy flux is larger or smaller than the outgoing energy flux, then the planet will gain (warm) or lose (cool) net heat energy in accordance with the law of energy conservation:  
 
When Earth's energy imbalance (EEI) shifts by a sufficiently large amount, it is directly measurable by orbiting satellite-based radiometric instruments.  Imbalances which fail to reverse over time will also drive long-term temperature changes in the atmospheric, oceanic, land, and ice components of the climate system. In situ temperature changes and related effects thus provide indirect measures of EEI.   From mid-2005 to mid-2019, satellite and ocean temperature observations have each independently shown an approximate doubling of the (global) warming imbalance in Earth's energy budget.

Direct measurement 
Several satellites directly measure the energy absorbed and radiated by Earth, and thus by inference the energy imbalance. The NASA Earth Radiation Budget Experiment (ERBE) project involves three such satellites: the Earth Radiation Budget Satellite (ERBS), launched October 1984; NOAA-9, launched December 1984; and NOAA-10, launched September 1986.

NASA's Clouds and the Earth's Radiant Energy System (CERES) instruments are part of its Earth Observing System (EOS) since 1998. CERES is designed to measure both solar-reflected (short wavelength) and Earth-emitted (long wavelength) radiation. Contributing factors included more water vapor, less clouds, increasing greenhouse gases, and declining ice that were partially offset by rising temperatures. Subsequent investigation of the behavior using the GFDL CM4/AM4 climate model concluded there was a less than 1% chance that internal climate variability alone caused the trend.

Other researchers have used data from CERES, AIRS, CloudSat, and other EOS instruments to look for trends of radiative forcing embedded within the EEI data. About 80% of the increase was associated with the rising concentration of greenhouse gases which reduced the outgoing longwave radiation.  

Further satellite measurements including TRMM and CALIPSO data have indicated additional precipitation, which is sustained by increased energy leaving the surface through evaporation (the latent heat flux), offsetting some of the increase in the longwave greenhouse flux to the surface.

It is noteworthy that radiometric calibration uncertainties limit the capability of the current generation of satellite-based instruments, which are otherwise stable and precise.   As a result, relative changes in EEI are quantifiable with an accuracy which is not also achievable for any single measurement of the absolute imbalance.

In situ measurements

Global surface temperature (GST):  GST is calculated by averaging temperatures measured at the surface of the sea along with air temperatures measured over land.   Reliable data extending to at least 1880 shows that GST has undergone a steady increase of about 0.18°C per decade since about year 1970. 

Ocean heat content (OHC):  Ocean waters are especially effective absorbents of solar energy and have far greater total heat capacity than the atmosphere.  Research vessels and stations have sampled sea temperatures at depth and around the globe since before 1960.  Additionally after year 2000, an expanding network of over 3000 Argo robotic floats has measured the temperature anomaly, or equivalently the heat content change (ΔOHC).  Since at least 1990, OHC has increased at a steady or accelerating rate.  These changes provide the most robust indirect measure of EEI since the oceans take up over 90% of the excess heat:
 

Global ice loss:  The extent of floating and grounded ice is measured by satellites,  while the change in mass is then inferred from measured changes in sea level in concert with computational models that account for thermal expansion and other factors.  Observations since 1994 show that ice has retreated from every part of Earth at an accelerating rate.

Importance as a climate change metric

Climate researchers Kevin Trenberth, James Hansen, and colleagues have identified the monitoring of Earth's energy imbalance as an imperative to help policymakers guide the pace of planning for climate change adaptation.  Because of climate system inertia, longer-term EEI trends can forecast further changes that are "in the pipeline".

In 2012, NASA scientists reported that to stop global warming atmospheric CO2 concentration would have to be reduced to 350 ppm or less, assuming all other climate forcings were fixed.  As of 2020, atmospheric CO2 reached 415 ppm and all long-lived greenhouse gases exceeded a 500 ppm -equivalent concentration due to continued growth in human emissions.

See also
 Lorenz energy cycle
 Planetary equilibrium temperature
 Climate sensitivity
 Tipping points in the climate system
 Anthropogenic metabolism

References

Additional bibliography for cited sources

IPCC reports

AR5 Working Group I Report 
 .

Special Report on Global Warming of 1.5 °C 
  Global Warming of 1.5 ºC — .

AR6 Working Group I Report

External links

NASA: The Atmosphere's Energy Budget
Clouds and Earth's Radiant Energy System (CERES)
NASA/GEWEX Surface Radiation Budget (SRB) Project

Atmospheric sciences
Climate forcing
Climate variability and change
Climatology
Earth
Earth sciences
Energy
Environmental science
Oceanography
Articles containing video clips